This is a list of places (local government areas) in Australia which have standing links to local communities in other countries. In most cases, the association, especially when formalised by local government, is known as "town twinning" (usually in Europe) or "sister cities" (usually in the rest of the world).

A
Adelaide

 Austin, United States
 Christchurch, New Zealand
 Himeji, Japan
 Qingdao, China
 Penang Island, Malaysia

Albany
 Nichinan, Japan

B
Ballarat
 Inagawa, Japan

Banana
 Boulouparis, New Caledonia

Bathurst
 Ōkuma, Japan

Bayside, New South Wales

 Binhai (Tianjin), China
 Bint Jbeil, Lebanon
 Bitola, North Macedonia
 Gaiarine, Italy
 Gilgandra, Australia
 Glyfada, Greece
 Takéo, Cambodia
 Yamatsuri, Japan

Bayside, Victoria

 Beaumaris, Wales, United Kingdom
 Cixi, China
 Nazareth, United States
 King's Lynn and West Norfolk, England, United Kingdom
 Palavas-les-Flots, France
 San Marino, San Marino

Bega Valley
 Littleton, United States

Belmont
 Adachi (Tokyo), Japan

Blacktown

 Liaocheng, China
 Liverpool Plains, Australia
 Porirua, New Zealand
 Suseong (Daegu), South Korea

Bland

 Boring, United States
 Dull, Scotland, United Kingdom
 Whitby, England, United Kingdom

Blue Mountains

 Flagstaff, United States
 Sanda, Japan

Brisbane

 Abu Dhabi, United Arab Emirates
 Auckland, New Zealand
 Chongqing, China
 Daejeon, South Korea
 Hyderabad, India
 Kaohsiung, Taiwan
 Kobe, Japan
 Semarang, Indonesia
 Shenzhen, China

Bunbury

 Jiaxing, China
 Setagaya (Tokyo), Japan

Bundaberg

 Nanning, China
 Settsu, Japan

Burwood

 Africo, Italy
 Badolato, Italy
 Cinquefrondi, Italy
 Gerace, Italy
 Geumcheon (Seoul), South Korea
 Martone, Italy
 Platì, Italy
 Sandakan, Malaysia

Busselton
 Sugito, Japan

C
Cairns

 Lae, Papua New Guinea
 Minami, Japan
 Oyama, Japan
 Riga, Latvia
 Scottsdale, United States
 Sidney, Canada
 Zhanjiang, China

Camden
 Kashiwa, Japan

Campaspe
 Shangri-La, China

Campbelltown

 Coonamble, Australia
 Koshigaya, Japan

Canberra

 Beijing, China
 Nara, Japan
 Wellington, New Zealand

Canterbury-Bankstown

 Broken Hill, Australia
 Colorado Springs, United States
 Suita, Japan
 Yangcheon (Seoul), South Korea

Central Coast
 Edogawa (Tokyo), Japan

Central Highlands

 Altona, Canada
 Ichinoseki, Japan

Charters Towers
 Daqing, China

Clarence
 Akkeshi, Japan

Cockburn

 Mobile, United States
 Split, Croatia
 Yueyang, China

Coffs Harbour
 Sasebo, Japan

Colac Otway
 Walker, United States

D
Darwin

 Ambon, Indonesia
 Anchorage, United States
 Dili, East Timor
 Haikou, China
 Kalymnos, Greece
 Milikapiti (Tiwi Islands), Australia

Devonport
 Minamata, Japan

Dubbo

 Minokamo, Japan
 Newcastle, Australia
 Toyama, Japan
 Wujiang (Suzhou), China

F
Fairfield

 Griffith, Australia
 Hsinchu, Taiwan
 Locri, Italy
 Palmi, Italy
 Platì, Italy
 Riace, Italy
 Roccella Ionica, Italy
 San Giorgio Morgeto, Italy
 San Lorenzo, Italy
 Siderno, Italy
 Zhenjiang, China

Federation
 Miki, Japan

Frankston

 Susono, Japan
 Wuxi, China

Fraser Coast

 Kasukabe, Japan
 Leshan, China

Fremantle

 Capo d'Orlando, Italy
 Funchal, Portugal
 Molfetta, Italy
 Seberang Perai, Malaysia
 Yokosuka, Japan

G
Gladstone
 Saiki, Japan

Gold Coast

 Beihai, China
 Chengdu, China
 Dubai, United Arab Emirates
 Fort Lauderdale, United States
 Netanya, Israel
 Nouméa, New Caledonia
 Tainan, Taiwan
 Taipei, Taiwan
 Takasu, Japan
 Zhuhai, China

Goulburn Mulwaree

 Jiangdu (Yangzhou), China
 Shibetsu, Japan
 Wagin, Australia

Greater Bendigo

 Haimen, China
 Los Altos, United States
 Penzance, England, United Kingdom

Greater Dandenong
 Xuzhou, China

Greater Geelong
 Lianyungang, China

Greater Geraldton

 Kosai, Japan
 Zhanjiang, China

Greater Shepparton

 Baguio, Philippines
 Lijiang, China
 Novato, United States
 Ōshū, Japan
 Toyoake, Japan

Griffith

 Borso del Grappa, Italy
 Castelcucco, Italy
 Cavaso del Tomba, Italy
 Fairfield, Australia
 Harbin, China
 Monfumo, Italy
 Pieve del Grappa, Italy
 Possagno, Italy

Gunnedah

 Lane Cove, Australia
 Yinzhou (Ningbo), China

H
Hawkesbury

 Kyōtamba, Japan
 Temple City, United States

Hilltops
 Lanzhou, China

Hobart

 L'Aquila, Italy
 Yaizu, Japan

Hobsons Bay
 Anjō, Japan

I
Inner West – Marrickville

 Bethlehem, Palestine
 Funchal, Portugal
 Keelung, Taiwan
 Kos, Greece
 Larnaca, Cyprus
 Safita, Syria
 Zonnebeke, Belgium

Ipswich

 Changde, China
 Hyderabad, India
 Nantou, Taiwan
 Nerima (Tokyo), Japan
 Pengzhou, China
 Wenzhou, China

Isaac
 Yantai, China

J
Joondalup
 Jinan, China

L
Lake Macquarie

 Hakodate, Japan
 Rotorua Lakes, New Zealand
 Round Rock, United States
 Tanagura, Japan

Lane Cove

 Gunnedah, Australia
 Huzhou, China

Latrobe

 Taizhou, China
 Takasago, Japan

Launceston

 Ikeda, Japan
 Napa, United States
 Putian, China
 Taiyuan, China

Lismore

 Eau Claire, United States
 Lismore, Ireland
 Makassar, Indonesia
 Yamatotakada, Japan

Liverpool
 Toda, Japan

Logan

 Hirakata, Japan

 Suzhou, China
 Taoyuan, Taiwan

Lockyer Valley
 Ageo, Japan

M
Macedon Ranges
 Tōkai, Japan

Mackay

 Honiara, Solomon Islands
 Kailua-Kona, United States
 Matsuura, Japan
 Yantai, China

Manjimup
 Jiashan, China

Marion
 Kokubunji, Japan

Melbourne

 Boston, United States
 Milan, Italy
 Osaka, Japan

 Thessaloniki, Greece
 Tianjin, China

Mildura

 Dali, China
 Kumatori, Japan
 Upland, United States

Moreland

 Çorum, Turkey
 Solarino, Italy
 Sparta, Greece
 Xianyang, China

Moreton Bay

 San'yō-Onoda, Japan
 Winton, Australia

N
North Burnett – Gayndah
 Zonhoven, Belgium

Northern Beaches

 Bath, England, United Kingdom
 Brewarrina, Australia
 Huntington Beach, United States
 Jing'an (Shanghai), China
 Taitō (Tokyo), Japan

O
Oberon

 Eceabat, Turkey

Orange

 Mount Hagen, Papua New Guinea
 Orange, United States
 Timaru, New Zealand
 Ushiku, Japan

P
Parkes
 Coventry, England, United Kingdom

Penrith

 Fujieda, Japan
 Gangseo (Seoul), South Korea
 Penrith, England, United Kingdom

Perth

 Chengdu, China
 Houston, United States
 Kagoshima, Japan
 Kastellorizo, Greece
 Nanjing, China
 Perth, Scotland, United Kingdom
 Rhodes, Greece
 San Diego, United States
 Seocho (Seoul), South Korea

 Vasto, Italy

Port Lincoln

 Lincoln, England, United Kingdom
 Muroto, Japan
 Mwandi, Zambia

Port Macquarie-Hastings
 Handa, Japan

Port Phillip
 Ōbu, Japan

Port Stephens

 Bellingham, United States
 Tateyama, Japan
 Yugawara, Japan

R
Randwick

 Albi, France
 Kastellorizo, Greece
 Randwick, England, United Kingdom

Redland
 Qinhuangdao, China

Richmond Valley
 Cassino, Italy

Rockhampton
 Ibusuki, Japan

Rockingham
 Akō, Japan

S
Salisbury
 Mobara, Japan

Southern Downs
 Shiwa, Japan

Strathfield
 Gapyeong, South Korea

Subiaco

 Subiaco, Italy
 Subiaco, United States

Sunshine Coast

 Fenland, England, United Kingdom
 Le Mont-Dore, New Caledonia
 Tatebayashi, Japan
 Xiamen, China

Sutherland

 Chūō (Tokyo), Japan
 Lakewood, United States

Sydney

 Florence, Italy
 Guangzhou, China
 Nagoya, Japan
 Portsmouth, England, United Kingdom
 San Francisco, United States
 Wellington, New Zealand

T
Tamworth

 Chaoyang (Beijing), China
 Gore, New Zealand
 Nashville, United States
 Sannohe, Japan
 Tamworth, England, United Kingdom

Tea Tree Gully
 Asakuchi, Japan

Temora

 Izumizaki, Japan
 Upington, South Africa

Tenterfield
 Ottobeuren, Germany

Toowoomba

 Paju, South Korea
 Takatsuki, Japan
 Whanganui, New Zealand
 Yuecheng (Shaoxing), China

Townsville

 Changshu, China
 Foshan, China
 Iwaki, Japan
 Port Moresby, Papua New Guinea
 Shūnan, Japan
 Suwon, South Korea

W
Wagga Wagga

 Kunming, China
 Leavenworth, United States
 Nördlingen, Germany

Warrnambool

 Changchun, China
 Miura, Japan

Whitehorse
 Matsudo, Japan

Whitsunday
 Yantai, China

Willoughby

 Gangdong (Seoul), South Korea
 Guardia Sanframondi, Italy

 Suginami (Tokyo), Japan

Wollongong

 Kawasaki, Japan
 Ohrid, North Macedonia

Wyndham

 Changzhou, China
 Chiryū, Japan
 Costa Mesa, United States

References

Australia
Lists by city in Australia
Foreign relations of Australia
Lists of populated places in Australia